Ugly Stik is a subsidiary company of Shakespeare, a fishing equipment retail company. Ugly Stik is primarily known for its fishing rods. Shakespeare, originally called William Shakespeare, Jr. Company, was founded by William Shakespeare, Jr. in 1897 in Kalamazoo, Michigan. The William Shakespeare, Jr. Company changed its name to Shakespeare in 1915, then moved its base of operations to Columbia, South Carolina in 1970. In 1976, Shakespeare introduced the Ugly Stik rod.

About
One of the characteristics of the Ugly Stik rod that made it such a success when it was first introduced was the way it was built. Shakespeare used the Howald process, which was first used in the “Wonderod” in 1947. This rod was invented by Dr. Arthur M. Howald, and it would forever change the way Shakespeare would build rods. The process used by Howald in building this Wonderod was perfected by Shakespeare, and was used in building the first Ugly Stik rods. The rods made using this method included “an internal spiral fiberglass core and parallel glass fibers impregnated with pigmented polyester resin”, which was then covered in several layers of tape to hold these components together while they “cured in an oven”.  The tape was then removed with high-pressure water jets.  Ugly Stik rods today are still made using the Howald process, but materials and methods have been tweaked considering the changes in technology since 1976. The modern Ugly Stik rods can be bent into a circle without snapping, which can be credited to the Howald Process.  The construction process of Ugly Stik rods means a finished product that is sturdy and stiff, yet flexible. Sensitivity is also a large part of Ugly Stik’s success, as newer models are also built using graphite in the center of the fiberglass wraps. While the fiber glass provides the strength and stiffness that fishing demands, the graphite provides sensitivity.

Ugly Stik got its name from the "ugly" appearance of their first rods. The first Ugly Stik rods were very large, featured metal handles, the graphite color showed through the blank, and the wraps were black with white pinstripes. Over the years, the appearance of Ugly Stik rods evolved into the now recognizable “red and yellow basket weave” design near the handle, a shiny jet-black finish, and a clear tip. 

Shakespeare did not just manufacture fishing tackle. During World War I, their “factory was converted to manufacture mortar fuses and automobile carburetors”.  In World War II, Shakespeare manufactured controls for tanks, automobiles, and aircraft. “Shakespeare also manufactured the first fiberglass radio antennas, golf club shafts, pool cues, archery equipment, and numerous industrial materials”.  From 1968 to 1986, Shakespeare manufactured trolling motors.  Today, Shakespeare also sells non-fishing related Ugly Stik products, such as car decals, hats, glasses, and clothing.

References

External links
Ugly Stik page at Pure Fishing site

Companies based in Michigan